Lister Park (also known as Manningham Park) is a picturesque public park in Bradford, West Yorkshire, England, between Manningham, Heaton and Frizinghall. It has won various national awards.

About the park 
It is situated about a mile outside the city centre on Manningham Lane, the main road between Bradford and Shipley.  It is one of the city's largest parks and was purchased by the City of Bradford for half its commercial value from Samuel Cunliffe Lister, who built Lister's Mill.

An open air swimming pool, the Lister Park Lido was added to the park in 1915. Although it was very popular in its early years, by the 1930s the public were losing interest in the facility which no longer met the standards of hygiene they expected. In response to proposals made by the baths committee, the council carried out a modernisation scheme in 1937 which involved the installation of a filtration, sterilisation and heating plant. A cafe was also added.  The Lido was reopened in May 1939. Popularity of the Lido waned over time and by 1982 repairs to the value of £60,000 were needed. The Lido closed in 1983 and was demolished in 1991.

The park has been successfully renovated in recent years.  The lake has been re-opened for boats and a Mughal Water Garden constructed.  There are also tennis and basketball courts, bowling greens and a children's playground. Bradford parkrun, a free, weekly, 5 km, hosted by local volunteers, is held in the park at 9 am every Saturday.

Lister Park contains the Cartwright Hall art gallery, where permanent and temporary exhibitions of modern and traditional art can be seen.

It was voted Britain's Best Park for 2006, and nominated for the Best Park In Europe 2006.

See also
Listed buildings in Bradford (Heaton Ward)
Listed buildings in Bradford (Manningham Ward)

References

External links 

 Bradford District Parks: Lister Park
 City of Bradford: Images of Lister Park.
 Telegraph & Argus: Article on the Friends of Lister Park, who recently got the lion sculptures returned to the park, 6 June 2009.
 Bradford Timeline: Sir Titus Salt Details of history, designers and sculptors of Titus Salt monument.

Parks and commons in Bradford
Manningham, Bradford